Mathilde Kristensen (born 7 April 1993) is a Danish handball player who plays for Vipers Kristiansand in Norway.

Achievements
EHF Champions League:
Bronze medalist: 2018/2019
EHF Cup: 
Finalist: 2018
Norwegian League:
Winner: 2017/2018 (Vipers), 2018/2019 (Vipers)
Norwegian Cup:
Winner: 2017, 2018

References

1993 births
Living people
People from Viborg Municipality
Danish female handball players
Danish expatriate sportspeople in Norway
Expatriate handball players
Sportspeople from the Central Denmark Region